Zhang Xudong (November 1962 – 1 October 2021) was a general (Shangjiang) of the People's Liberation Army (PLA) of China. He was commander of the Western Theater Command. He was promoted to the rank of major general (shaojiang) in July 2012, lieutenant general (zhongjiang) in July 2018, and general (Shangjiang) in December 2020.

Biography
Zhang was born in Qian'an, Tangshan, Hebei province in 1962. He enlisted in the People's Liberation Army in September 1981 and joined the Communist Party in August 1984. He served in Shenyang Military Region for a long time. He once served as chief of staff of the 39th Army Group Army. In February 2014, he succeeded Pan Liangshi as commander of the 39th Army Group Army. In March 2017, he was appointed deputy commander of the Central Theater Command and commander of the Central Theater Command Ground Force. On October 1, 2019, he was deputy commander in chief of the 70th anniversary of the People's Republic of China. In December 2020, he became commander of the Western Theater Command, succeeding Zhao Zongqi. 

Zhang died on 1 October 2021, from cold conditions while deployed with his troops near the LAC.

References

1962 births
2021 deaths
People's Liberation Army generals from Liaoning
Commanders of Western Theater Command